The Diana class, also known as the Minor Standard Craft Mk II, are a class of six patrol boats in service with the Royal Danish Navy. Built by Faaborg Værft A/S, the ships displace  and have a maximum speed of  knots. The class was intended to replace the aging Barsø class of patrol boats. The lead ship of the class, entered Danish service in 2007. The Diana-class vessels were initially tasked with fisheries protection, patrol and search and rescue but are currently tasked with international and combat operations.

Design and description
The Diana class, also known as the Minor Standard Craft Mk II, are a series of patrol vessels constructed of glass reinforced plastic. They are powered by two MTU 16V396 TB94 diesel engines turning two shafts with controllable pitch propellers creating . The ships mount two  machine guns and have a complement of 9, with accommodation for 15 total. The Diana-class patrol vessels each have space for a StanFlex container, allowing for quick mission re-configuration.

Ships

Construction and service history
The class was ordered from Faaborg Værft A/S on 3 December 2004, with the hull, superstructure and machinery constructed by Kockums at their yard in Karlskrona, Sweden. Upon entering service, the Diana-class patrol vessels were used for fisheries protection, patrol and search and rescue. The six vessels of the Diana class are assigned to the Royal Danish Navy's 2nd Squadron, which is tasked with international and combat operations.

Notes

Citations

References

External links
 
 

Patrol boat classes
Patrol vessels of Denmark